André Filipe Tavares Gomes  (born 30 July 1993) is a Portuguese professional footballer who plays as a central midfielder for Ligue 1 club Lille, on loan from  club Everton.

He played three years at Benfica, where he won the domestic treble in the 2013–14 season. In July 2014 he joined Valencia and, two years later, signed with Barcelona also in the Spanish La Liga. Following a year on loan at Everton, he agreed to a permanent contract in 2019.

Gomes earned 37 caps for Portugal all youth levels accounted for, including six for the under-21s. He represented the nation at Euro 2016 – winning the tournament – and the 2017 Confederations Cup.

Club career

Benfica
Born in Grijó, Vila Nova de Gaia, Porto District, Gomes joined Benfica's youth system at age 18, playing his last year as a junior with the Lisbon club. On 28 July 2012 he appeared in his first game with the first team, a friendly with Gil Vicente, and spent his first season as a senior with the reserve side, competing in the Segunda Liga.

Gomes scored his first goals with Benfica B in league matches against Braga B (2–2 home draw) and Belenenses (6–0, also at home). On 18 October 2012, he made his official debut with the main squad, playing 25 minutes after coming on as a substitute for Eduardo Salvio and netting in a 4–0 win at Freamunde in the Taça de Portugal.

Gomes' momentum in Benfica's first team continued on 27 October 2012, as he started and scored in a 3–0 away victory over Gil Vicente in his first Primeira Liga appearance. However, he continued to be mainly associated with the B-team.

On 31 January 2014, Benfica (and Benfica Stars Fund) sold 100% of Gomes' economic rights to a private company, Meriton Capital Limited, for €15 million, plus 25% of a future transfer fee. He remained at the Estádio da Luz until the end of the campaign.

On 16 April 2014, Gomes played the full 90 minutes in the second leg of the semi-finals of the Portuguese Cup, scoring the final 3–1 after a brilliant individual effort to help his team – who played with one man less for 60 minutes against Porto – win the tie 3–2 on aggregate. He ended the season with 23 games in all competitions, helping the club win the first treble in its history (league, cup and Taça da Liga).

Valencia
On 17 July 2014, Gomes agreed to a one-season loan deal with Valencia, joining a host of compatriots including manager Nuno Espírito Santo. Although his economic rights were owned by Peter Lim, a loan deal was arranged to take him and Rodrigo to the Spanish club due to Lim's purchase of the latter.

Gomes made his La Liga debut on 23 August 2014, starting in a 1–1 away draw against Sevilla. He scored his first goal in the competition on 22 September, netting the second of a 3–0 win at Getafe.

On 12 June 2015, Benfica and Valencia announced that they had reached an agreement on Gomes' federative rights. Subsequently, he signed a contract with the Spaniards until 30 June 2020.

Barcelona
On 21 July 2016, Barcelona reached an agreement with Valencia for the transfer of Gomes, for a fee of €35 million plus €20 million in add-ons. He made his competitive debut on 17 August, playing the full 90 minutes in a 3–0 home win against Sevilla in the Supercopa de España and being directly involved in two of the goals.

Gomes scored his first goal for the team on 19 March 2017, closing a 4–2 home win against his former club Valencia. He was voted the worst signing of the season by readers of Marca. In the final of the Copa del Rey, however, he replaced injured Javier Mascherano early into the first half of the match against Alavés, playing mostly as a right-back and providing the assist for Neymar who netted the second in an eventual 3–1 triumph.

Everton

On 9 August 2018, and even though he was nursing a leg injury sustained during pre-season, Gomes moved to English club Everton on a season-long loan for €2.25 million. He made his Premier League debut on 21 October, playing 82 minutes in a 2–0 home win over Crystal Palace. He scored his first goal for the team on 2 February 2019, in a 1–3 home defeat to Wolverhampton Wanderers.

Gomes was a regular for the Toffees during his spell, but on 16 April 2019 he received a three-match ban for standing on the leg of Fulham's Aleksandar Mitrović during the 2–0 loss at Craven Cottage. He signed a permanent five-year contract on 25 June, for a £22 million transfer fee.

On 3 November 2019, Gomes sustained a serious ankle injury in a Premier League home game against Tottenham Hotspur after a tackle by Son Heung-min and subsequent collision with Serge Aurier. Referee Martin Atkinson was going to give Son a yellow card initially, but changed it to red after realising the severity of the situation; the red card was later overturned by The Football Association, while Gomes was expected to make a full recovery after successful surgery.

On 23 February 2020, Gomes completed his return from injury in the second half of Everton's 3–2 away loss against Arsenal. In September 2022, he joined French Ligue 1 club Lille on a season-long loan. He scored his first goal for the latter on 4 February 2023 in a 3–1 victory at Rennes; his performance earned him a rate of 8/10 in L'Équipe, the best of the match.

International career

Gomes represented Portugal at the 2012 UEFA European Under-19 Championship. At the age of 19, he received his first call-up to the senior team, for a friendly against Ecuador on 6 February 2013, but remained unused in the 2–3 home loss.

On 7 September 2014, Gomes made his full debut, starting and playing 90 minutes in a 0–1 defeat to Albania at the Estádio Municipal de Aveiro for the UEFA Euro 2016 qualifiers. He was selected for the squad that appeared in the finals in France, starting in their first game, a 1–1 draw with Iceland in Saint-Étienne where he provided the assist to Nani's goal before being replaced by Eder late into the second half.

Gomes also represented Portugal at the 2017 FIFA Confederations Cup in Russia, playing four times as they finished in third place. He was included in a preliminary 35-man squad for the 2018 FIFA World Cup, but did not make the final cut; in total, he earned 29 caps.

Career statistics

Club

International

Honours
Benfica
Primeira Liga: 2013–14
Taça de Portugal: 2013–14; runner-up: 2012–13
Taça da Liga: 2013–14
UEFA Europa League runner-up: 2012–13, 2013–14

Barcelona
La Liga: 2017–18
Copa del Rey: 2016–17, 2017–18
Supercopa de España: 2016

Portugal
UEFA European Championship: 2016
FIFA Confederations Cup third place: 2017

Individual
UEFA European Under-19 Championship Team of the Tournament: 2012
UEFA Europa League Squad of the Season: 2013–14

Orders
 Commander of the Order of Merit

References

External links

Everton official profile

National team data 

1993 births
Living people
Sportspeople from Vila Nova de Gaia
Portuguese footballers
Association football midfielders
Primeira Liga players
Liga Portugal 2 players
S.L. Benfica B players
S.L. Benfica footballers
La Liga players
Valencia CF players
FC Barcelona players
Premier League players
Everton F.C. players
Ligue 1 players
Lille OSC players
Portugal youth international footballers
Portugal under-21 international footballers
Portugal international footballers
UEFA Euro 2016 players
UEFA European Championship-winning players
2017 FIFA Confederations Cup players
Portuguese expatriate footballers
Expatriate footballers in Spain
Expatriate footballers in England
Expatriate footballers in France
Portuguese expatriate sportspeople in Spain
Portuguese expatriate sportspeople in England
Portuguese expatriate sportspeople in France
Commanders of the Order of Merit (Portugal)